The Regents of the University of Michigan, sometimes referred to as the board of regents, is a constitutional office of the U.S. state of Michigan which forms the governing body of the University of Michigan, comprising the campuses at Ann Arbor, Flint, and Dearborn. The Board of Regents was first created by legislative act in 1837, and the regents as a body corporate have been defined in the Constitution of Michigan since 1850. There are eight regents, two of whom are elected to an eight-year term by statewide ballot every two years, plus the president of the University of Michigan, who serves ex officio but does not vote.

Michigan is one of four states with public university governing boards elected directly by the people (along with Colorado, Nebraska, and Nevada). In contrast, the state universities and the consolidated or coordinating boards in other states are controlled by governors and legislatures. The board of regents is one of three elected university governing boards—along with the Michigan State University board of trustees and the Wayne State University board of governors—defined by the constitution of Michigan.

Current board 
The current board of regents consists of eight regents, two of whom are elected on a partisan statewide ballot every two years to an eight-year term, plus the president of the University of Michigan as an ex officio member. The regents (excepting the president) serve without compensation, and meet once a month in public session. As of December 2022, the board consists of six Democrats and two Republicans:

 Santa Ono, ex officio, President of the University of Michigan
 Michael J. Behm, Democrat from Grand Blanc, first elected 2014
 Mark Bernstein, Democrat from Ann Arbor, first elected 2012
 Sarah Hubbard, Republican from Lansing, first elected 2020
 Denise Ilitch, Democrat from Bingham Farms, first elected in 2008
 Jordan Acker, Democrat from Huntington Woods, first elected in 2018
 Paul Brown, Democrat from Ann Arbor, first elected in 2018
 Ronald Weiser, Republican from Ann Arbor, first elected in 2016
 Katherine White, Democrat from Ann Arbor, first elected in 1998

History 

The board of regents was created by the Organic Act of March 18, 1837, that established the modern University of Michigan. The terms of the regents and their method of selection have undergone several changes since 1837, but the board has served as a continuous body since then. Although the board of regents was formed as a new legal entity in 1837, the Michigan Supreme Court ruled in 1856 that it was legally continuous with the board of trustees of the University of Michigan that was formed in 1821, and with the Catholepistemiad, or University, of Michigania that was formed in 1817.

In 1817, Michigan Chief Justice Augustus B. Woodward drafted a territorial act establishing a "Catholepistemiad, or University, of Michigania. The territorial act was signed into law August 26, 1817, by Woodward, Judge John Griffin, and acting governor William Woodbridge (in place of Governor Lewis Cass, who was absent on a trip with President James Monroe). In consequence of the foregoing territorial act and the 1856 ruling, the present-day University of Michigan recognizes 1817 as the year of its founding.

Controversy over the homeopathic school 

Prior to 1850, the University of Michigan in its various incarnations was a product of the Michigan Legislature (or its territorial equivalents), and the Board of Regents and its predecessors were subject to oversight and control by the Legislature. The state constitution of 1850 elevated the Board of Regents to the level of a constitutional corporation, making the University of Michigan the first public institution of higher education in the country so organized. The Legislature did not give up its control easily, and the Board of Regents engaged in a number of battles with legislators before the matter was settled, several of them involving the establishment of a school of homeopathy.

In 1851, a group of citizens who supported the homeopathy movement petitioned the Legislature to force the Board of Regents to add professors of homeopathy to the medical school staff. The board took no action, but Dr. Zina Pitcher wrote a detailed account of their thinking to leave for their incoming replacements (the first class of elected regents in 1852):
...shall the accumulated results of three thousand years of experience be laid aside, because there has arisen in the world a sect which, by engrafting a medical dogma upon a spurious theology, have built up a system (so-called) and baptized it Homœopathy? Shall the High Priests of this spiritual school be specially commissioned by the Regents of the University of Michigan, to teach the grown up men of this age that the decillionth of a grain of sulphur will, if administered homœopathically, cure seven-tenths of their diseases, whilst in every mouthful of albuminous food they swallow, every hair upon their heads, and every drop of urine distilled from the kidneys, carries into or out of their system as much of that article as would make a body, if incorporated with the required amount of sugar, as large as the planet Saturn?

Nothing further happened until 1855, when the Legislature revisited the subject and modified the Organic Act to include the provision that "there shall always be one Professor of Homœopathy in the Department of Medicine." The Board of Regents again took no action to comply. In 1867, the Legislature used the power of the purse and passed a statewide property tax to benefit the university "provided the board of regents would comply with the law of 1855, and appoint at least one professor in the medical department of the university." Although the money was desperately needed, the regents again refused to comply, and two years later the money was released by the Legislature without restriction. By 1871, the expressed public desire for a Homeopathic School led the Board of Regents to consider establishing one at Detroit, separate from the Medical School. In 1875, the school was actually established, but in Ann Arbor, not Detroit.

In 1895, the positions were reversed, and the Legislature tried to force the regents to move the Homeopathic School from Ann Arbor to Detroit. The regents refused, and the Michigan Supreme Court ruled that the state constitution explicitly defined the powers of the Board of Regents independently of the Legislature, while every other corporation the constitution created had its powers specified by the Legislature. Justice Claudius Grant wrote: "No other conclusion was...possible than that the intention was to place the institution in the direct and exclusive control of the people themselves, through a constitutional body elected by them."

This ruling established the precedent that regents are constitutional officers and the Board of Regents is an independent body answerable to the people of the state, not to the Governor or Legislature. The Homeopathic School at the center of the battle was eventually merged into the Medical School in 1922.

List of members 

The name, size, and method of filling the body now known as the Regents of the University Michigan has changed several times in its history.

Catholepistemiad, or University, of Michigania (1817–1821) 

The Catholepistemiad, or University, of Michigania, was established by the Governor and Judges of Michigan Territory in 1817, following a plan devised by Chief Justice Augustus Woodward. The Catholepistemiad was self-governed by the professors (or Didactors) that held its thirteen professorships (didaxiim). In fact, the thirteen didaxiim were divided up between just two men, who thus controlled the entire institution:
 Rev. John Monteith, President (and holder of seven professorships)
 Father Gabriel Richard, vice-president (and holder of six professorships)

Board of Trustees of the University of Michigan (1821–1837) 

In 1821, the Governor and Judges of Michigan Territory renamed the Catholepistemiad to the University of Michigan, and placed control of the university in the hands of a board of trustees consisting of 20 citizens plus the Governor. Their previous positions abolished, Father Richard and Rev. Monteith were both appointed to the board of trustees; Monteith left that summer for a professorship at Hamilton College, while Richard remained on the board until his death in 1832.

As it was common during this era for the Governor to be absent, the various men who served as Acting Governor are included in this list in italics, but no specific dates should be inferred as to when exactly they were Acting Governor. Also, no predecessor/successor relationship among specific Trustees should be inferred from their relative position in the table. Using the terms in office cited in the historical sources, at some points there are up to 22 simultaneous Trustees, even though only 20 were called for.

Source:

Appointed Regents of the University of Michigan (1837–1852) 

The Organic Act of March 18, 1837, created the modern board of regents. In its original form, it consisted of 12 members appointed by the Governor with the consent of the Senate, along with the Governor himself, the Lieutenant Governor, the Justices of the Michigan Supreme Court, and the Chancellor of the state. The act also created the office of chancellor of the university, who was to be appointed by the Regents and serve as ex officio President of the board. In fact, however, the Regents never appointed a chancellor, instead leaving administrative duties up to a rotating roster of professors, and the Governor chaired the board himself.

Although the name of the institution they governed was the same, the Board of Regents was a distinct legal entity from the board of trustees. The Board of Trustees transferred all of their property to the new board of regents, but forgot to include the lot in Detroit where the Catholepistemiad had first been located. The court case involving the eventual recovery of this property led to the Michigan Supreme Court deciding in 1856 that the board of regents, the board of trustees, and the Didactors of the Catholepistemiad were a legally continuous entity. The Regents continued to treat 1837 as the founding year of the University of Michigan until 1929, when they reversed policy and adopted 1817 as the official founding date.  That act makes the University of Michigan officially, if not actually, the oldest university in the Big Ten; in actuality, Indiana University, founded in 1820 and granting degrees before the University of Michigan was in existence, is the oldest Big Ten school.

Note: Successorship is well-defined for the ex officio Regents, but no specific predecessor/successor relationships is implied for the appointed Regents, except where specifically noted by an asterisk (*) which denotes Regents explicitly named as a successor to the previous one.

Source:

Elected Regents of the University of Michigan (1852–present) 

The state constitution of 1850 made the Regents of the University of Michigan a statewide elected body, and also created the office of President of the University of Michigan, who was to be an ex officio member and preside over the Board without a vote. The first regents elected under the new system were elected in 1852.

Originally, one regent was elected from each of the eight judicial circuits in Michigan, for a six-year term, with all regents up for election simultaneously. By the time of the next election, the number of circuits had grown to ten, so ten regents were elected for the term beginning in 1858. This fluctuation in the size of the board, combined with the controversy over the regents' firing of President Henry Philip Tappan just before the end of their term in 1863, led to a new law that fixed the size of the board at eight members, elected on a statewide basis to an eight-year term, with terms staggered such that two are up for election every two years. The constitutional convention of 1908 added the Superintendent of Public Instruction as an ex officio member of the board, a move which was reversed by the constitutional convention of 1963.

Source: Names and dates , party affiliations

Notes

References

Further reading

External links
 Regents of the University of Michigan
 Proceedings of the Board of Regents of the University of Michigan (1837-2005)

 
1837 establishments in Michigan
University of Michigan
History of the University of Michigan